John V. Orth is an American legal scholar and author. He is the William Rand Kenan Jr. Professor of Law at the University of North Carolina-Chapel Hill.

He earned an A.B. (1969) at Oberlin College, and then proceeded to acquire a J.D. (1974), M.A. (1975), and PhD (1977) at Harvard University.

Publications
Books
DUE PROCESS OF LAW: A BRIEF HISTORY (Y. Mingcheng trans., Commercial Press, Beijing, 2006) (2003).
HOW MANY JUDGES DOES IT TAKE TO MAKE A SUPREME COURT? AND OTHER ESSAYS ON LAW AND THE CONSTITUTION (University Press of Kansas, 2006).
DUE PROCESS OF LAW: A BRIEF HISTORY (University Press of Kansas 2003).
THE NORTH CAROLINA STATE CONSTITUTION, WITH HISTORY AND COMMENTARY (University of North Carolina Press, 1995).
COMBINATION AND CONSPIRACY: A LEGAL HISTORY OF TRADE UNIONISM, 1721-1906 (Oxford University Press, 1991).
THE JUDICIAL POWER OF THE UNITED STATES: THE ELEVENTH AMENDMENT IN AMERICAN HISTORY (Oxford University Press, 1991).

Articles and Book Chapters
Fact and Fiction in the Law of Property, 11 GREEN BAG 2d 65 (2007). LexisNexis Westlaw
Second Thoughts in the Law of Property, 10 GREEN BAG 2d 65 (2006). LexisNexis Westlaw
The Enumeration of Rights: "Let Me Count the Ways," 9 U. PA. J. CONST. L. 281 (2006). LexisNexis Westlaw
A Bridge, a Tax Revolt, and the Struggle to Industrialize: A Comment, 84 N.C. L. REV. 1927 (2006). Hein LexisNexis Westlaw
The Burden of an Easement, 40 REAL PROP. PROB. & TR. J. 639 (2006). Hein LexisNexis Westlaw
The Race to the Bottom, 9 GREEN BAG 2d 47 (2005). LexisNexis Westlaw
Who Judges the Judges?, 32 FLA. ST. U. L. REV. 1245 (2005). Hein LexisNexis Westlaw
Intention in the Law of Property: The Law of Unintended Consequences, 8 GREEN BAG 2d 59 (2004). LexisNexis Westlaw
Relocating Easements: A Response to Professor French, 38 REAL PROP., PROB. & TR. J. 643 (2004). LexisNexis
The Secret Sources of Judicial Power, 50 LOY. L. REV. 529 (2004). Hein LexisNexis
THOMPSON ON REAL PROPERTY (2d. ed. 2004)(chapters 31-33, concurrent estates) (revised annually).
Judging the Tournament (contribution to online symposium, "The Judicial Confirmation Process: Selecting Federal Judges in the Twenty-First Century") (2003), in JURIST, at http://jurist.law.pitt.edu/forum/symposium-jc.
The Mystery of the Rule in Shelley’s Case, 7 GREEN BAG 2d 45 (2003). LexisNexis Westlaw
Night Thoughts: Reflections on the Debate Concerning Same-Sex Marriage, 3 NEV. L.J. 560 (2003). Hein LexisNexis
Sale of Defective Houses: Cicero and the Moral Choice, 6 GREEN BAG 2d 163 (2003). LexisNexis Westlaw
Common Law; Commonwealth v. Hunt; Probate; Trust; and Will, in THE OXFORD COMPANION TO AMERICAN LAW (K. Hall ed., Oxford University Press 2002).
How Many Judges Does It Take to Make a Supreme Court? 19 CONST. COMMENT. 681 (2002). LexisNexis Westlaw
Joint Tenancy Law: Plus Ca Change..., 5 GREEN BAG 2d 173 (2002). LexisNexis Westlaw
What's Wrong With the Law of Finders and How to Fix It, 4 GREEN BAG 2d 391 (2001). LexisNexis Westlaw
"Confusion Worse Confounded": The Residential Rental Agreement Act, 78 N.C. L. REV. 783 (2000). Hein LexisNexis Westlaw
History and the Eleventh Amendment, 75 NOTRE DAME L. REV. 1147 (2000). Hein LexisNexis Westlaw
John Marshall and "Debts Which Ought Never to Have Been Contracted": An Unpublished Letter, 4 GREEN BAG 2d 49 (2000). LexisNexis Westlaw
Presidential Impeachment: The Original Misunderstanding, 17 CONST. COMMENT. 587 (2000). Hein LexisNexis Westlaw
Did Sir Edward Coke Mean What He Said?, 16 CONST. COMMENT. 33 (1999). Hein LexisNexis Westlaw
Joint Tenancies, Tenancies in Common,& Tenancies by the Entirety, in 4 THOMPSON ON REAL PROPERTY (Thomas ed., annual supp.).
Bettman, Alfred; Connor, Henry Groves; Fuller, Melville Weston; Gray, John Chipman; Haywood, John; Henderson, Leonard; and Lurton, Horace Harmon, in AMERICAN NATIONAL BIOGRAPHY (J. Garraty ed., Oxford University Press 1999).
Contract and the Common Law (Ch. 2), in THE STATE AND FREEDOM OF CONTRACT (H. N. Scheiber ed., Stanford University Press 1998).
Exporting the Rule of Law, 24 N.C. J. INT'L L. & COM. REG. 71 (1998). Hein LexisNexis Westlaw
John Marshall and the Rule of Law, 49 S.C. L. REV. 633 (1998). Hein LexisNexis Westlaw
Taking from A and Giving to B: Substantive Due Process and the Case of the Shifting Paradigm, 14 CONST. COMMENT. 337 (1997). Hein LexisNexis Westlaw
Tenancy by the Entirety: The Strange Career of the Common-Law Marital Estate, 1997 B.Y.U. L. REV. 35 (1997). Hein LexisNexis Westlaw
Why the North Carolina Court of Appeals Should Have a Procedure for Sitting En Banc, 75 N.C. L. REV. 1981 (1997). Hein LexisNexis Westlaw
Russell v. Hill (N.C. 1899): Misunderstood Lessons, 73 N.C. L. REV. 2031 (1995). Hein LexisNexis Westlaw
Who Is a Tenant? The Correct Definition of the Status in North Carolina, 21 N.C. CENT'L L.J. 79 (1995). Hein
Contributions to THE ENCYCLOPEDIA OF AMERICAN CIVIL LIBERTIES, THE ENCYCLOPEDIA OF NORTH CAROLINA, GOVERNMENTS OF THE WORLD, and THE AMERICAN MIDWEST: AN INTERPRETIVE ENCYCLOPEDIA.
Book reviews for ALBION, THE AMERICAN HISTORICAL REVIEW, THE AMERICAN JOURNAL OF LEGAL HISTORY, THE JOURNAL OF CHURCH AND STATE, and The NEW CRIMINAL LAW REVIEW.

References

Living people
Year of birth missing (living people)
Place of birth missing (living people)
American legal scholars
Harvard Law School alumni
University of North Carolina at Chapel Hill faculty
Oberlin College alumni